Seven stages of action is a term coined by the usability consultant Donald Norman. 
The phrase appears in chapter two of his book The Design of Everyday Things, describing the psychology of a person performing a task.

Building up the Stages

History 
The history behind the action cycle starts from a conference in Italy attended by Donald Norman.
This excerpt has been taken from the book The Design of Everyday Things:
I am in Italy at a conference. I watch the next speaker attempt to thread a film onto a projector that he never used before. He puts the reel into place, then takes it off and reverses it. Another person comes to help. Jointly they thread the film through the projector and hold the free end, discussing how to put it on the takeup reel. Two more people come over to help and then another. The voices grow louder, in three languages: Italian, German and English. One person investigates the controls, manipulating each and announcing the result. Confusion mounts. I can no longer observe all that is happening. The conference organizer comes over. After a few moments he turns and faces the audience, who had been waiting patiently in the auditorium. "Ahem," he says, "is anybody expert in projectors?" Finally, fourteen minutes after the speaker had started to thread the film (and eight minutes after the scheduled start of the session) a blue-coated technician appears. He scowls, then promptly takes the entire film off the projector, rethreads it, and gets it working.

Norman pondered on the reasons that made something like threading of a projector difficult to do. To examine this, he wanted to know what happened when something implied nothing. In order to do that, he examined the structure of an action. So to get something done, a notion of what is wanted – the goal that is to be achieved, needs to be started. Then, something is done to the world i.e. take action to move oneself or manipulate someone or something. Finally, the checking is required if the goal was made. This led to formulation of Stages of Execution and Evaluation.

Stages of Execution 
Execution formally means to perform or do something. Norman explains that a person sitting on an armchair while reading a book at dusk, might need more light when it becomes dimmer and dimmer. To do that, he needs to switch on the button of a lamp i.e. get more light (the goal). To do this, one must need to specify on how to move one's body, how to stretch to reach the light switch and how to extend one's finger to push the button. The goal has to be translated into an intention, which in turn has to be made into an action sequence.

Thus, formulation of stages of execution:
 Start at the top with the goal, the state that is to be achieved.
 The goal is translated into an intention to do some action.
 The intention must be translated into a set of internal commands, an action sequence that can be performed to satisfy the intention.
 The action sequence is still a mutual event: nothing happens until it is executed, performed upon the world.

Stages of Evaluation 
Evaluation formally means to examine and calculate. Norman explains that after turning on the light, we evaluate if it is actually turned on. A careful judgement is then passed on how the light has affected our world i.e. the room in which the person is sitting on the armchair while reading a book.

The formulation of the stages of evaluation can be described as:
 Evaluation starts with our perception of the world.
 This perception must then be interpreted according to our expectations.
 Then it is compared (evaluated) with respect to both our intentions and our goals.

Seven Stages of Action 

Seven Stages of Action constitute four stages of execution, three stages of evaluation and our goals.

1. Forming the target.

2. Forming the intention

3. Specifying an action

4. Executing the action

5. Perceiving the state of the world

6. Interpreting the state of the world

7. Evaluating the outcome

The Gulfs

The Gulf of Execution 
The difference between the intentions and the allowable actions is the Gulf of execution.
"Consider the movie projector example: one problem resulted from the Gulf of Execution. The person wanted to set up the projector. Ideally, this would be a simple thing to do. But no, a long, complex sequence was required. It wasn't all clear what actions had to be done to accomplish the intentions of setting up the projector and showing the film."

The Gulf of Evaluation 
The Gulf of evaluation reflects the amount of effort that the person must exert to interpret the physical state of the system and to determine how well the expectations and intentions have been met.
"In the movie projector example there was also a problem with the Gulf of Evaluation. Even when the film was in the projector, it was difficult to tell if it had been threaded correctly."

Usage as Design Aids 
The seven-stage structure is referenced as design aid to act as a basic checklist for designers'  questions to ensure that the Gulfs of Execution and Evaluation are bridged.

The Seven Stages of relationship can be broken down into 4 main principles of good design:
 Visibility - By looking, the user can tell the state of the device and the alternatives for action.
 A Good Conceptual Model - The designer provides a good conceptual model for the user, with consistency in the presentation of operations and results and a coherent, consistent system image.
 Good mappings - It is possible to determine the relationships between actions and results, between the controls and their effects, and between the system state and what is visible.
 Feedback - The user receives full and continuous feedback about the results of the actions.

See also 
 Affordance
 Executive system
 Usability engineering
 Human action cycle
 Human-computer interaction
 Interaction Design
 User-centered design
 Visibility
 Usability
 Gulf of evaluation
 Gulf of execution

References

External links 

 Donald Norman's Seven Stages of Action - What are Norman's Seven Stages
 University of Hawaii's Lecture on Donald Norman's book
 Monash University's 2003 Monash Web Workshop Series' Lecture on Usability and Human factors
 University of Limerick's (Ireland) lecture on Donald Norman

Usability
Technical communication
Human–computer interaction
Action (philosophy)